Giuseppe Maria Reina (born 23 October 1954 in Catania) is an Italian politician.

Biography
Reina was a member of the Christian Democracy for a long time and later of the UDC; he served as municipal assessor and councilor of Misterbianco and as provincial assessor and councilor of the Province of Catania.

He was also a member of the board of directors of the University of Catania and of the Chamber of Commerce of Catania.

In 2006 he has been elected to the Chamber of Deputies among the ranks of the Northern League–Movement for Autonomy list. In 2008 he was not re-elected, however he was appointed Undersecretary for Infrastructure and Transport in the Berlusconi IV Cabinet. On 15 November 2010, after the MpA left the governing coalition with PdL and LN, Reina resigned as undersecretary.

References

1954 births
Living people
Politicians from Catania
21st-century Italian politicians
Movement for the Autonomies politicians